The following is a list of Croatian film, television and theatre actors, listed in alphabetical order.



A
Dejan Aćimović (b. 1963)
Božidar Alić (1954–2020)

B
Lana Barić (b. 1979)
Relja Bašić (1930–2017)
Ena Begović (1960–2000)
Mia Begović (b. 1963)  
Rene Bitorajac (b. 1972)
Goran Bogdan (b. 1980)
Slavko Brankov (1951–2006)
Amar Bukvić (b. 1981)
Boris Buzančić (1929–2014)

C
Zlatko Crnković (1936–2012)
Petar Cvirn (b. 1986)
Zrinka Cvitešić (b. 1979)

D
Dragan Despot (b. 1956)
Franjo Dijak (b. 1977)
Nataša Dorčić (b. 1968)
Vanja Drach (1932–2009)
Vlatko Dulić (1943–2015)
Boris Dvornik (1939–2008)

Đ
Jadranka Đokić (b. 1981)

E
Nela Eržišnik (1922–2007)

F
Tarik Filipović (b. 1972)
Božidarka Frajt (b. 1940)
Mira Furlan (1955–2021)

G
Nada Gačešić-Livaković (b. 1951)
Stanka Gjurić (b. 1956)
Emil Glad (1929–2009)
Ratko Glavina (b. 1941)
Ivo Gregurević (1952–2019)
Goran Grgić (b. 1965)

H
Ivan Herceg (b. 1981)

I
Nives Ivanković (b. 1967)
Ilija Ivezić (1926–2016)

J
Nataša Janjić (b. 1981)
Zdenko Jelčić (b. 1946)
Filip Juričić (b. 1981)
Zvonimir Jurić (b. 1971)

K
Jagoda Kaloper (1947–2016)
Ana Karić (1941–2014)
Hrvoje Kečkeš (b. 1975)
Ljubomir Kerekeš (b. 1960)
Marija Kohn (1934–2018)
Kristina Krepela (b. 1979)
Robert Kurbaša (b. 1977)
Pero Kvrgić (1927–2020)

L
Dolores Lambaša (1981–2013)
Frano Lasić (b. 1954)
Alen Liverić (b. 1967)
Tonko Lonza (1930–2018)
Leon Lučev (b. 1970)

M
Franjo Majetić (1923–1991)
Ante Čedo Martinić (1960–2011)
Stojan Matavulj (b. 1961)
Rene Medvešek (b. 1963)
Sven Medvešek (b. 1965)

N
Mustafa Nadarević (1943–2020)
Antun Nalis (1911–2000)
Bojan Navojec (b. 1976)
Goran Navojec (b. 1970)
Suzana Nikolić (b. 1965)

O
Ecija Ojdanić (b. 1974)
Mia Oremović (1918–2010)
Božidar Orešković (1942–2010)

P
Olga Pakalović (b. 1978)
Leona Paraminski (b. 1979)
Stjepan Perić (b. 1983)
Frane Perišin (b. 1960)
Edo Peročević (1937–2007)
Janko Popović Volarić (b. 1980)
Žarko Potočnjak (1946–2021)
Marinko Prga (b. 1971)
Alma Prica (b. 1962)
Matija Prskalo (b. 1966)

R
Zvonimir Rogoz (1887–1988)
Vicko Ruić (b. 1959)

S
Martin Sagner (b. 1932–2019)
Lucija Šerbedžija (b. 1973)
Rade Šerbedžija (b. 1946)
Ivo Serdar (1933–1985)
Marija Škaričić (b. 1977)
Slavko Sobin (b. 1984)
Semka Sokolović-Bertok (1935–2008)
Fabijan Šovagović (1932–2001)
Filip Šovagović (b. 1966)
Anja Šovagović (b. 1963)

Š
Antonija Šola (b. 1979)
Tamara Šoletić (b. 1965)

U
Robert Ugrina (b. 1974)

V
Sanja Vejnović (b. 1961)
Jelena Veljača (b. 1981)
Ivica Vidović (1939–2011)
Nina Violić (b. 1972)
Goran Višnjić (b. 1972)
Ornela Vištica (b. 1989)
Zlatko Vitez (b. 1950)
Antun Vrdoljak (b. 1931)
Mladen Vulić (b. 1969)
Predrag Vušović (1960–2011)

Z
Vera Zima (1953–2020)

See also
Lists of actors

Croatian actors

Actors